Nathaniel Parrish Conrey (June 30, 1860 – November 2, 1936) was an associate justice of the Supreme Court of California from October 1, 1935, to November 2, 1936. His 36 years on the bench place him among the longest serving judges in California history.

Biography

Conrey was born June 30, 1860, in Franklin County, Indiana to David La Rue and Hannah Jameson. He was raised in Shelbyville, Indiana, and educated in the public schools. He studied at Indiana Asbury University, receiving an A.B. degree in 1881 and a M.A. in 1884 from DePauw University. He continued his graduate education at the University of Michigan School of Law, graduating in 1883 with a LL.B.

In 1884, Conrey moved to California, was admitted to the bar, and entered private practice. From 1886 to 1887, he served as Pasadena City Attorney. He served on the Los Angeles City Board of Education from 1897 to 1898. He was elected as a Republican to the California State Assembly from the 75th district, serving in 1899 to 1900. In 1896, he was on the faculty at the University of Southern California as a professor of medical jurisprudence. In 1899, he was re-appointed as a trustee of the Los Angeles Normal School (which after 1919 was re-named the University of California, Los Angeles).

In 1900,  Governor Henry Gage appointed Conrey as a judge of the Los Angeles County Superior Court. He was elected in 1902, 1908, and again in 1910, serving three terms. On October 26, 1913, Governor Hiram Johnson appointed Conrey as Presiding Justice of the California Court of Appeal, Second District, Division One, to fill the vacancy caused by the death of Matthew T. Allen. In 1914, Conrey successfully ran for re-election.

Governor Frank Merriam appointed Conrey, at age 75, as an associate justice of the Supreme Court of California, which position he held from October 1, 1935, to November 2, 1936.

On August 6, 1936, Conrey announced that he would resign from the supreme court, and would not stand for election that November. On September 14, Governor Frank Merriam selected Douglas L. Edmonds to stand in Conrey's place on the November ballot, and, two days later, he was seated as an associate justice pro tempore on the court. Conrey, who concluded his active service on the court in August, intended to officially resign once Edmonds was elected, but he died on November 2, the day before the election, from complications of the spinal cord injury that had prompted his resignation.

Personal life

On November 21, 1890, he married Ethelwyn Wells in Los Angeles. They had a son and two daughters: David W. Conrey, Olive Ethelwyn Conrey (Lindsey), and Maryline Conrey.

References

External links
 Nathaniel P. Conrey. California Supreme Court Historical Society.
 In Memoriam
 Nathaniel P. Conrey. California Court of Appeal,  Second Appellate District, Division One.
 
 Join California Nathaniel P. Conrey

See also
 List of justices of the Supreme Court of California

1860 births
1936 deaths
People from Franklin County, Indiana
DePauw University alumni
University of Michigan Law School alumni
University of Southern California faculty
Justices of the Supreme Court of California
Judges of the California Courts of Appeal
Superior court judges in the United States
Republican Party members of the California State Assembly
Lawyers from Los Angeles
20th-century American lawyers
20th-century American judges
University of California, Los Angeles people